The Congregation is the fourth studio album by Norwegian progressive metal band Leprous. The album was released on 25 May 2015 in Europe and 2 June 2015 in North America. This album was partially recorded at Fascination Street in Sweden, and the vocals developed with Heidi Solberg Tveitan and Ihsahn at Mnemosyne Studios in Norway.

It is the last album to feature longtime guitarist Øystein Landsverk, who was featured on all Leprous albums until then. It is also the first album of the band without drummer Tobias Ørnes Andersen, who was replaced with Baard Kolstad, and with Simen Daniel Børven on bass.

Reception 
The album was nominated for the 2015 Spellemannprisen in the "metal" category.

Track listing

Personnel

Leprous 
 Einar Solberg – lead vocals, keyboards
 Tor Oddmund Suhrke – guitar
 Øystein Landsverk – guitar
 Simen Børven – bass guitar
 Baard Kolstad – drums

Production 
 Jens Bogren – mixing
 Nihil – cover art

Charts

References 

2015 albums
Leprous albums
Inside Out Music albums